Michael Starr may refer to:
Michael Starr (politician) (1910–2000), Canadian politician
Mike Starr (actor) (born 1950), American actor
Mike Starr (musician) (1966–2011), American bassist
Michael Starr (singer) (born 1965), American singer

See also
Mike Starrs, Scottish singer